Nicolás Klappenbach (born 25 March 1982) is a Uruguayan rugby union player. He plays as a hooker. He is a physician.

Klappenbach plays for Champagnat Rugby, in Uruguay.

He has 38 caps for Uruguay, since 2005, with 2 tries scored, 10 points on aggregate. He played at the 2007 Rugby World Cup and at the 2011 Rugby World Cup qualifyings. He was involved in the 2015 Rugby World Cup successful qualification. He has been the captain for the "Teros".

References

External links

1982 births
Living people
Uruguayan people of German descent
Uruguayan rugby union players
Uruguay international rugby union players
Rugby union hookers